The men's javelin throw event at the 1970 Summer Universiade was held at the Stadio Comunale in Turin on 1 and 2 September 1970.

Medalists

Results

Qualification
Qualifying mark: 70.00 metres

Final

References

Athletics at the 1970 Summer Universiade
1970